The 11th Thailand National Games (Thai: กีฬาเขตแห่งประเทศไทย ครั้งที่ 11, also known as the 1977 National Games and the 1977 Inter-Provincial Games) were held in Bangkok, Thailand from 11 to 17 December 1977, with contests in 14 sports and athletes from 10 regions. These games were the qualification for Thai athletes in the 1978 Asian Games.

Emblem
The emblem of 1977 Thailand National Games was a red circle, with the emblem of Sports Authority of Thailand on the inside and surrounded by the text

Participating regions
The 11th Thailand National Games represented 10 regions from 72 provinces. The country that made their Thailand National Games debut was Phayao, formerly part of Chiang Rai.

Sports
The 1977 Thailand National Games featured 10 Olympic sports contested at the 1977 Southeast Asian Games, 1978 Asian Games and 1980 Summer Olympics. In addition, four non-Olympic sports were featured: badminton, sepak takraw, table tennis and tennis.

References

External links
 Sports Authority of Thailand (SAT)

National Games
Thailand National Games
National Games
Thailand National Games
National Games